Irene Kim (November 6, 1987), also known by her online alias Ireneisgood, is an American model, beauty and fashion blogger, and television personality. In 2018, Kim released her clothing brand IRENEISGOOD LABEL.

Early life 
Irene Kim was born in Iowa, to South Korean parents and raised in Seattle, Washington. In middle school, Kim and her family moved to South Korea, where she attended a Christian boarding school. Kim studied textile design at New York's Fashion Institute of Technology. While interning at JYP Entertainment, Kim came up with the leopard print concept for the Wonder Girls' single, "So Hot".

Kim credits her sense of style to her grandmother.

Career

Modeling 
Kim's first runway show was for Jardin de Chouette and SJYP in 2012. Kim walked for J Koo, KYE, Youser, Supercomma B, and S=YZ. She has worked with designers such as Mulberry, Ferragamo, MATCHESFASHION, MaxMara, Calvin Klein, Charles & Keith, and Chanel.  

In 2015, Kim was appointed as Estée Lauder's Global Beauty Contributor with Kendall Jenner. Kim is a brand ambassador for Chanel.

She appeared on magazine covers for Cosmopolitan Korea, Marie Claire Taiwan, W Korea, Harper's Bazaar Korea, Elle Thailand, and Grazia Magazine China.

Kim is known for her multi-colored hair.

Television 
In 2015, Kim became a co-host for Mnet's original programming, "K-Style", a show introducing Korean trends in fashion, beauty, and lifestyle. A few years later, she became co-host of CJ E&M's channel Onstyle on a program called, "Style Live". Her segment was titled, "Irene Live". In 2019, Irene became one of the hosts for CJ E&M's "Get It Beauty" program, a show that shares beauty tips and trends.

In 2019, Kim met with E News' E Social Studies Club to discuss the meaning of Ireneisgood. 

With Eva Chen, the head of fashion partnerships at Instagram, Kim was one of the influencers who appeared on The Today Show to introduce spring trends of the 2019 season.

Label 
In June 2018, Irene released her brand, IRENEISGOOD LABEL. The Label had pop-ups in Shanghai, China and Seoul, South Korea. In March 2019, IRENEISGOOD Label released its first sneaker collaboration and pop-up with JOSHUAS in Taiwan.

Appearances

Awards 
In 2017, Kim won the "Style Influencer" award at the ELLE Style Awards.

References

External links 
 
 Instagram
 Facebook
 Twitter
 YouTube

1987 births
Living people
21st-century American women writers
21st-century South Korean women writers
American expatriates in South Korea
American female models
American models of Korean descent
American people of South Korean descent
American women non-fiction writers
American writers of Korean descent
Female models from Iowa
South Korean female models
South Korean non-fiction writers
American bloggers
American women bloggers
South Korean bloggers
South Korean women bloggers